Mawan is a town of about 41,000 in the east-central part of Hubei province, People's Republic of China. It is under the administration of the sub-prefecture-level city of Tianmen,  to the west-northwest. To the north is Lake Chen, and to the north is Lake Hua.

Administrative divisions

Mawan has undergone several administrative changes since the founding of the People's Republic: in 1950, it was created as a township, changed to a people's commune in 1976, upgraded to a district in 1984, and with the formation of Tianmen as a sub-prefecture-level city, downgraded to a town in 1987. It is noted for being the ancestral hometown of overseas Chinese, spread across 34 nations and territories on 5 continents.

One community:
Mawan

Twenty-five villages:
Machang, Chenma, Luwan, Zouwan, Zhengwan, Bianhekou, Litan, Yangang, Zhawu, Hengdi, Nanzha, Zhangwan, Chenhuang, Liaowan, Jianghu, Zengliu, Guozui, Datai, Wangchen, Hedi, Xiaohu, Kuangtai, Tukeng, Chendu, Chengang

References

External links
*马湾镇简介 (Introduction to Mawan)

Township-level divisions of Hubei